The Meyer Fryman House is a private house located at 211 Michigan Street in Petoskey, Michigan. It was placed on the National Register of Historic Places in 1986. The house is unusual in Petoskey, in that it is constructed of concrete blocks.

The Meyer Fryman House is -story font-gable bungalow constructed of concrete blocks. It has a gabled front porch, and a single-story wing extends to the rear. The eaves are exposed on the sides of the house, and the windows have multi-paned units over single lights.

The house was constructed in the early 20th century, possibly as early as 1902. It is associated with Meyer Fryman, who owned a shoe business.

References

Houses on the National Register of Historic Places in Michigan
Colonial Revival architecture in Michigan
Houses completed in 1902
Emmet County, Michigan
1902 establishments in Michigan